Jean Moscopol (real name: Ioan Moscu; February 26, 1903 – 1980) was a Romanian singer of the interwar period, who spent his last years in the US.

Biography
Moscopol's parents were Greek. His mother, née Constantinidi, was from Constanța, while his father originated in Mesembria on the shores of the Black Sea. From there he settled in Brăila, where he opened a pastry shop and then worked as a jeweller, like one of his sisters. Jean Moscopol was born in Brăila, where he showed ease of learning from his early days. He could play several instruments (including the banjo and mandolin) and, besides Romanian, spoke French, Italian, English, German and Greek fluently. His first formal education took place at Brăila's Greek school, and he continued learning in that city, also taking classes at its Lyra conservatory, before finishing high school in Galați.

From 1921–22, he was a clerk at the M. Embiricos et Co Maritime Agency. While an aeronautics student, someone advised him to put his musical talent to use and make some recordings. At that moment, music became his profession. He made his performing debut in 1929 at the Zissu bar on Șerban Vodă Street, Bucharest. He would spontaneously create epigrams for the clients and banter with them. He also published a book of epigrams, 101 răutăți ("101 Naughty Sayings"). Around this time he also made his first gramophone recordings and first appeared on radio. He took music lessons in 1930, passed an examination and was confirmed as a professional artist. H. Nicolaide hired him at the Alhambra Revue Theatre, where he sang in the operettas Alhambritta, Lăsați-mă să cânt and Contesa Maritza.

That year he signed an exclusive contract with the London-based RCA Records. By 1936, his repertoire included some 300 songs of various genres, both Romanian and foreign; he helped popularize the tango in his native land. In 1932 he went to Berlin, where he recorded discs with famous orchestras such as Hönigsberg and James Kok, and took bel canto lessons with Professor Korst.

With the end of World War II, Moscopol's fortunes changed, as his political opinions stood in marked contrast to those of the Romanian Communist Party then gaining ascendancy. Not wishing to serve the régime, he managed to flee to the United States in 1945. Arriving in New York City, he worked as a hotel porter, investing the money he earned into a small musical ensemble. With this group he continued playing the songs that brought him renown in 1930s Bucharest, as well as anti-communist and exile-themed music. He played an active role in the Saint Dumitru Romanian Orthodox parish. He died in exile in 1980, never having married.

These were released in Bucharest in 1993. Songs of his include "Vrei să ne-ntâlnim sâmbătă sara?", "Mână, birjar" and "Tot ce-i românesc nu piere", as well as "Dă-mi gurița s-o sărut".

Due to his vehement opposition to the Russification policies put in effect during the Soviet occupation of Romania, the Communist regime tried to erase Moscopol from the national memory by marginalizing him. Around 2005, director Ștefan Gladin met with great difficulties when he sought information about Moscopol for a biographical film; few archival documents about him remained.

Notes

External links
 "Jean Moscopol, trubadurul graseiat" ("Jean Moscopol, the Trilling Troubadour"), Vali Blănaru, Jurnalul Național, October 25, 2004.
 "Jean Moscopol - erou de film" ("Jean Moscopol - Film Hero"), Călin Stănculescu, România liberă, August 5, 2005.

1903 births
1980 deaths
People from Brăila
Romanian people of Greek descent
Members of the Romanian Orthodox Church
Romanian people of World War II
Romanian anti-communists
Romanian expatriates in the United States
Romanian singer-songwriters
Romanian cabaret performers
Tango musicians
Romanian mandolinists
Banjoists
Romanian humorists
Romanian male poets
Romanian epigrammatists
20th-century Romanian male singers
20th-century Romanian singers
Romanian emigrants to the United States
American people of Romanian descent